Pandanus montanus ("Baquois redresse") is a species of monocots in the genus Pandanus, endemic to Réunion in wet forest and swamp at an elevation of 400–1700 meters.

Description
It is a small, slender tree of 3–5 m in height. Its fruit-head is initially held up erectly, but droops down and becomes dark red when ripe. Each fruit head is packed with red, dome-shaped drupes.

Synonyms 
 Pandanus borbonicus Huynh 
 Pandanus erigens Thouars 
 Pandanus gaudichaudii Martelli 
 Sussea conoidea Gaudich. 
 Sussea microcarpa Gaudich.

References 
 Cirad (Centre de coopération internationale en recherche agronomique pour le développement) entry

montanus
Endemic flora of Réunion